Leonard Leo Brooks, Jr. (December 7, 1947 –  April 4, 2002) was a professional American football defensive lineman, who played for the National Football League's St. Louis Cardinals. Following the death of his father-in-law that spring, he gave up his football playing career and returned to Austin to run the family business. He was diagnosed with esophageal cancer in February 2001 and died on April 4, 2002 at the M. D. Anderson Hospital in Houston.

External links
Lee Brooks Pro-Football-Reference.com. Retrieved 2019-03-18.

1947 births
2002 deaths
People from Shidler, Oklahoma
American football defensive linemen
Texas Longhorns football players
Houston Oilers players
St. Louis Cardinals (football) players
Deaths from cancer in Texas
Deaths from esophageal cancer